Ottuk is a village in the Tong District of Issyk-Kul Region of Kyrgyzstan. It is located in proximity to Issyk Kul. Its population was 2,561 in 2021.

References

Populated places in Issyk-Kul Region